The Rwanda Over The Counter Market (ROTCE), was a stock market in Rwanda. It was founded on 31 January 2008 and operated out of Kigali, the capital city of Rwanda. The market was run by the Rwandan government, with ambitions to become independent. Initially the exchange only sold bonds - one offered by the country's central bank; the National Bank of Rwanda and one by the Commercial Bank of Rwanda.  Later in 2009, equities began being listed on the exchange.  the listed equities on the exchange are as summarized in the table below:

Market listing

 Kenya Commercial Bank Group is crosslisted on the Nairobi Stock Exchange, the Dar es Salaam Stock Exchange and on the Rwanda Over The Counter Exchange.
 Nation Media Group is crosslisted on the Nairobi Stock Exchange and on the Uganda Securities Exchange.

Cessation of activities and replacement
On 31 January 2011, the activities of Rwanda Over The Counter Exchange were taken over by the Rwanda Stock Exchange, whose activities are supervised by the Capital Markets Advisory Council (CMAC).

See also
Rwanda Stock Exchange
List of African stock exchanges

References

Stock exchanges in Africa
Economy of Rwanda
Government-owned companies of Rwanda
2008 establishments in Rwanda
Financial services companies disestablished in 2011
Defunct companies of Rwanda
Financial services companies established in 2008
Defunct stock exchanges